El ciego, is a Mexican telenovela produced by Televisa and originally transmitted by Telesistema Mexicano.

Cast 
Julio Alemán as El Ciego
Belem Diaz
Rafael Cabrera
Fina Alvaner

References

External links 

Mexican telenovelas
Televisa telenovelas
Spanish-language telenovelas
1969 telenovelas
1969 Mexican television series debuts
1969 Mexican television series endings